Model Citizens is a reality television show which aired on PAX TV in 2004. Models travelled to different parts of the United States and worked on community projects such as building a basketball court or an aviary. The show was hosted by Larissa Meek of Average Joe: Hawaii, a model and former Miss Missouri USA and Miss USA contestant.

Episode list 
 "A Place Called Home"
 "Bayside Community Center"
 "Building an Aviary"
 "Camp Starfish"
 "New Hampshire Beach Clean-Up"
 "P.E.A.C.E.: Project Greenhouse"
 "Utica Fire Station"

References
 

Modeling-themed reality television series
2000s American reality television series
2004 American television series debuts
2004 American television series endings